The Rhinoceros Sutra also known as The Rhino Sutra (or ) is a very early Buddhist text advocating the merit of solitary asceticism for pursuing enlightenment as opposed to practicing as a householder or in a community of monastics. The goal of this was to become a pratyekabuddha, who wandered alone through the forest like a rhinoceros.

Origins
This identification has been reinforced by the discovery of a version in the Gandhāran Buddhist texts, one of the oldest Buddhist (and, indeed, Indian) manuscripts extant. There is also a Buddhist Hybrid Sanskrit version of it in the Mahāvastu. The early date for the text along with its rather unusual (within community-oriented Buddhism) approach to monastic life have led some scholars to suggest that it represents a holdover from a very early stage of Buddhism.

Themes
The scripture consists of a series of verses which discuss both the perils of community life and the benefits of solitude, almost all of which end with the admonition that seekers should wander alone like an Indian rhinoceros. The verses are somewhat variable between versions, as is the ordering of verses, suggesting a rich oral tradition that diverged regionally or by sect before being written down.

Association with pratyekabuddhas
Traditional commentaries on the text have unanimously associated the Rhinoceros Sutra with the Buddhist tradition of pratyekabuddhas.

In the Abhidharma-samuccaya, a 4th-century Mahayana work, Asaṅga describes followers of the Pratyekabuddhayāna as those who dwell alone like the horn of a rhinoceros, or as a solitary conquerors (Skt. pratyekajina) living in a small group. Here they are characterized as utilizing the same canon of texts as the śrāvakas who follow the Śrāvakayāna, namely the Śrāvaka Piṭaka, but having a different set of teachings, the Pratyekabuddha Dharma.

Naming controversy
There is an ongoing dispute over whether the title, "sword-horn" sutra, is to be taken as a  compound ("a sword which is a horn") or as a bahuvrīhi compound ("one who has a sword as a horn"). In the former case, the title should be rendered "The Rhinoceros-Horn Sutra"; in the latter case, it should be rendered "The Rhinoceros Sutra." There is textual evidence to support either interpretation.

In general, Mahayana traditions in India took the title to refer to the image of an Indian rhinoceros, which is a solitary animal. The Theravāda tradition tended toward the "rhinoceros horn" interpretation, but there is some variance between Theravāda commentators, with some referring to the image of a rhinoceros rather than a rhinoceros horn.

Location in Buddhist Canons
In the Sutta Pitaka, this Pali sutta is the third sutta in the Khuddaka Nikaya's Sutta Nipata's first chapter (Uragavagga, or the "Snake Chapter," named after the chapter's first sutta), and thus can be referenced in the Pali Canon as "Sn 1.3."

See also 
 Early Buddhist texts
 Pali Canon
 Sutta Piṭaka
 Khuddaka Nikāya
 Sutta Nipāta
 Gandhāran Buddhist texts
 Timeline of Buddhism

References

Bibliography

External links 
 The Rhino Horn: A Teaching for the Hermit-minded (SuttaCentral), translation by Laurence Khantipalo Mills
 Khaggavisana Sutta: A Rhinoceros (Access to Insight), translated from the Pali by Thanissaro Bhikkhu

Khuddaka Nikaya